Henry Holland may refer to:
 Henry Holland, 3rd Duke of Exeter (1430–1475), Lancastrian leader during the Wars of the Roses
 Henry Holland (priest) (1556–1603), English writer on witchcraft
 Henry Holland (printer) (1583–1650?), English bookseller and printer
 Henry Holland (architect) (1745–1806), Georgian architect
 Sir Henry Holland, 1st Baronet (1788–1873), physician and travel writer
 Henry Holland (cricketer) (1791–1853), Hampshire cricketer
 Henry Holland, 1st Viscount Knutsford (1825–1914), politician
 Henry Scott Holland (1847–1918), English theologian and author; Canon of St Paul's Cathedral
 Henry Holland (mayor) (1859–1944), mayor of Christchurch, New Zealand
 Harry Holland (Henry Edmund Holland, 1868–1933), Australian-born newspaper owner and politician who relocated to New Zealand
 Henry Holland (missionary) (1875–1965), British Christian medical missionary who travelled to the Indian subcontinent to provide ophthalmologic surgery and care
 Henry F. Holland (1912–1962), U.S. Assistant Secretary of State for Inter-American Affairs, 1954–1956
 Harry Holland (artist) (born 1941), British painter
 Henry Holland (fashion designer) (born 1983), British fashion designer
 Henry Lancelot Holland, Governor of the Bank of England, 1865–1867